Šomrda (Serbian Cyrillic: Шомрда) is a mountain in eastern Serbia, near the town of Lepenski Vir. Its highest peak  has an elevation of  803 meters above sea level. Most of Šomrda is located in the Đerdap National Park.

References

External links
Photo tour on Šomrda on freebiking.org

Mountains of Serbia
Serbian Carpathians